Geoffrey Bannister (born 1946, Manchester, England) was  an English-American educator and geographer. He was the fourth president of Hawai'i Pacific University. His goals for the university were to expand the graduate program research as well as building connections with other universities around the world.

Bannister was born in Manchester, England. When he was 10 years old, his family moved to New Zealand. He completed a master's thesis on the distribution of retail centres in Dunedin in 1969, at the University of Otago.

He later moved to Toronto, Canada to get a doctorate in geography. He became a U.S. citizen in 1989.

References

British emigrants to New Zealand
English geographers
Hawaii Pacific University people
American geographers
Living people
1946 births
University of Otago alumni